Artūras Jeršovas (born 10 July 1986) is a retired Lithuanian football striker.

References

1986 births
Living people
Lithuanian footballers
FC Vilnius players
Interas-AE Visaginas players
FBK Kaunas footballers
FK Šilutė players
FK Žalgiris players
FC Šiauliai players
A Lyga players
Association football forwards
Lithuania under-21 international footballers
Lithuania international footballers